Keila JK is a football club based in Keila, Estonia. Founded in 1995, it currently plays in II Liiga.

Players

First-team squad
 ''As of 13 March 2018.

Statistics

League and Cup

References

External links
 
 Team info at Estonian Football Association

Football clubs in Estonia
Harju County